Warner Antonio Madrigal (born March 21, 1984) is a Dominican professional baseball pitcher who is currently a free agent. He has played in Major League Baseball (MLB) for the Texas Rangers, Nippon Professional Baseball for the Chunichi Dragons and in the Chinese Professional Baseball League for the Uni-President 7-Eleven Lions.

Professional career

Los Angeles Angels of Anaheim

At the end of the  season, the Angels decided to protect Madrigal from the Rule 5 Draft by putting him on their 40-man roster on November 6. However, because Madrigal had spent 6 years in the minor leagues with one team, he became a free agent at the close of the 2007 World Series on October 29.

Texas Rangers
The Texas Rangers subsequently signed Madrigal to a contract on November 18, 2007.

Madrigal made his debut for the Rangers on July 2, pitching in the 7th inning against the New York Yankees at old Yankee Stadium. Madrigal lasted only one-third of an inning, giving up six runs and Brett Gardner's first career hit.

Madrigal split the 2009 season between the major leagues and the Triple-A Oklahoma City RedHawks.

On April 8, 2010, Madrigal was placed on the 60-day disabled list. Upon his activation on June 24, 2010, Madrigal was outrighted off of the 40-man roster. On November 6, 2010, Madrigal elected free agency.

New York Yankees
On January 20, 2011, the New York Yankees signed Madrigal to a minor league contract with an invitation to spring training. He was assigned to the Scranton/Wilkes-Barre Yankees to begin the season. On June 24, 2011, he was released.

Arizona Diamondbacks
On December 21, 2012, he signed a minor league contract with the Arizona Diamondbacks. On June 11, 2013, Madrigal was released.

Chunichi Dragons
Madrigal signed with the Chunichi Dragons for the 2013 season. On the year for the Dragons, Madrigal pitched to a 2-0 record with a 3.23 ERA and 28 strikeouts.

Washington Nationals
On January 23, 2014, Madrigal signed a minor league contract with the Washington Nationals organization. He was assigned to the Syracuse Chiefs to begin the season. On August 7, 2014, Madrigal was released.

Uni-President 7-Eleven Lions
Madrigal signed with the Uni-President 7-Eleven Lions of the Chinese Professional Baseball League prior to the 2015 season. In his tenure in the CPBL, Madrigal pitched to a 4-5 record with a 2.75 ERA and 48 strikeouts in 55.2 innings of work.

Rieleros de Aguascalientes
On May 26, 2016, Madrigal signed with the Rieleros de Aguascalientes of the Mexican League. He was released by the Rieleros on June 24, 2016.

Algodoneros de Unión Laguna
On February 5, 2020, Madrigal signed with the Algodoneros de Unión Laguna of the Mexican League. Madrigal did not play in a game in 2020 due to the cancellation of the Mexican League season because of the COVID-19 pandemic. On February 19, 2021, Madrigal was released.

References

External links

NPB
CPBL

1984 births
Living people
Arizona League Angels players
Cedar Rapids Kernels players
Chunichi Dragons players
Dominican Republic expatriate baseball players in Japan
Dominican Republic expatriate baseball players in Mexico
Dominican Republic expatriate baseball players in the United States
Dominican Republic expatriate baseball players in Taiwan
Estrellas Orientales players
Frisco RoughRiders players
Major League Baseball pitchers
Major League Baseball players from the Dominican Republic
Mexican League baseball pitchers
Nippon Professional Baseball pitchers
Oklahoma City RedHawks players
Oklahoma RedHawks players
Provo Angels players
Sportspeople from San Pedro de Macorís
Reno Aces players
Rieleros de Aguascalientes players
Syracuse Chiefs players
Texas Rangers players
Tigres del Licey players
Toros del Este players
Trenton Thunder players
Uni-President 7-Eleven Lions players